Garrido Fino is a white wine grape grown mainly in the province of Huelva, in the region of Andalusia, Spain.

Synonyms 
Garrido Fino is also known under the synonyms Charrido Fino, Garrido Fino de Villanueva, Garrío Fino, and Palomino Garrío.

References

White wine grape varieties
Grape varieties of Spain